Live and Unreleased is a compilation of live recordings of the jazz fusion band Weather Report, released on Legacy Recordings in 2002. The tracks are taken from live performances that took place from November 27, 1975 to June 3, 1983. It is their third official live recording after the Japan-only Live in Tokyo from 1972 and 8:30 from 1979, although previous albums such as Heavy Weather (1977) and Night Passage (1980) also included occasional live tracks.

The discs are sequenced in non-chronological fashion, with songs from different line-ups cross-faded into one another. The compositions "In a Silent Way" and "Directions" had both been recorded by Miles Davis during the tenure of Josef Zawinul and Wayne Shorter in the Davis band. Compositions appeared on the following Weather Report albums: "Waterfall" on the band's debut; "Dr. Honoris Causa" on I Sing the Body Electric; "Cucumber Slumber" on Mysterious Traveller; "Freezing Fire" and "Man in the Green Shirt" on Tale Spinnin'; "Elegant People" and "Black Market" on Black Market; "Teen Town" and "Rumba Mamá" on Heavy Weather; "River People" on Mr. Gone; "Fast City," "Night Passage," and "Port of Entry" on Night Passage; "Plaza Real," "Where the Moon Goes," and "Two Lines" on Procession. "Portrait of Tracy" appeared on Jaco Pastorius, and "Cigano" is a previously unissued song.

Track listing

Disc one

Disc two

Personnel
 Josef Zawinul – keyboards
 Wayne Shorter – saxophones
 Alphonso Johnson – bass on "Freezing Fire", "Cucumber Slumber", "Man in the Green Shirt", "Cigano", and "Directions/Dr. Honoris Causa"
 Chester Thompson – drums on "Freezing Fire", "Cucumber Slumber", "Man in the Green Shirt", "Cigano", and "Directions/Dr. Honoris Causa"
Jaco Pastorius – fretless bass on "Fast City", "Portrait of Tracy", "Elegant People", "Teen Town", "Black Market", "River People", "In a Silent Way/Waterfall", "Night Passage", and "Port of Entry"
 Alex Acuña – drums on "Portrait of Tracy", "Elegant People", "Teen Town", and "Black Market"; percussion on "Freezing Fire", "Cucumber Slumber", "Man in the Green Shirt", "Cigano", "Rumba Mamá", and "Directions/Dr. Honoris Causa"
 Manolo Badrena – percussion on "Portrait of Tracy", "Elegant People", "Teen Town", "Black Market", and "Rumba Mamá"
 Peter Erskine – drums on "Fast City", "River People", "In a Silent Way/Waterfall", "Night Passage", and "Port of Entry"
 Robert Thomas Jr. – percussion on "Fast City", "Night Passage", and "Port of Entry"
 Victor Bailey – bass on "Plaza Real", "Where the Moon Goes", and "Two Lines"
 Omar Hakim – drums on "Plaza Real", "Where the Moon Goes", and "Two Lines"
 José Rossy – percussion on "Plaza Real", "Where the Moon Goes", and "Two Lines"

Production personnel
 Josef Zawinul, Wayne Shorter – original recording producers
 Josef Zawinul, Ivan Zawinul, Bob Belden – release producers
 Ivan Zawinul, Jim Anderson – mixing
 Fabiola Cáceres, Howard Fritzson – art direction
 Leigh Wells – cover illustration

References

External links 
  Weather Report - Live & Unreleased (2002) album releases & credits at Discogs
  Weather Report - Live & Unreleased (2002) album credits & user reviews at ProgArchives.com
  Weather Report - Live & Unreleased (2002) album to be listened on Spotify

Weather Report albums
Live jazz fusion albums
2002 live albums
Columbia Records live albums